Elgin Township is located in Kane County, Illinois. It is divided by the Fox River. As of the 2010 census, its population was 100,922 and it contained 35,690 housing units.

Geography

Most of the township is incorporated in the City of Elgin.

Township offices are located at 729 S. McLean Blvd Suite 200, Elgin, IL.

Demographics

References

External links
Official Website

Townships in Kane County, Illinois
Townships in Illinois